Admiral Murray may refer to:

Alexander Murray (1816–1884), U.S. Navy rear admiral
Brian Murray (governor) (1921–1991), Royal Australian Navy rear admiral
George Murray (Royal Navy officer, born 1741) (1741–1797), British Royal Navy vice admiral
George Murray (Royal Navy officer, born 1759) (1759–1819), British Royal Navy vice admiral
George Murray, 6th Lord Elibank (died 1785), British Royal Navy rear admiral
George D. Murray (1889–1956), U.S. Navy admiral
Larry Murray (born 1947), Royal Canadian Navy vice admiral
Leonard W. Murray (1896–1971), Royal Canadian Navy rear admiral
Paul Murray (admiral) (fl. 1980s–1990s), South African Navy vice admiral
Robert Murray (Royal Navy officer) (c. 1763–1834), British Royal Navy admiral
Stuart S. Murray (1898–1980), U.S. Navy vice admiral